James "Buddy" Green is a former American football coach. He served as head football coach at the University of Tennessee at Chattanooga from 1994 to 1999, compiling a record of 27–39. Green had two stints as the defensive coordinator at his alma mater, North Carolina State University, from 1990 to 1993 and 2000 to 2001, and a 13-year run as the defensive coordinator at the United States Naval Academy, from 2002 to 2014.

Green played football and baseball at NC State before graduating in 1976.

Head coaching record

College

References

External links
 Navy profile

Year of birth missing (living people)
Living people
American football cornerbacks
Auburn Tigers football coaches
Chattanooga Mocs football coaches
LSU Tigers football coaches
Navy Midshipmen football coaches
NC State Wolfpack baseball players
NC State Wolfpack football coaches
NC State Wolfpack football players
Southern Jaguars football coaches
VMI Keydets football coaches
High school football coaches in North Carolina